Although not widely accepted in  linguistics, the term preverb is used in Caucasian (including all three families: Northwest Caucasian, Northeast Caucasian and Kartvelian), Caddoan, Athabaskan, and Algonquian linguistics to describe certain elements prefixed to verbs. In the context of Indo-European languages, the term is usually used for separable verb prefixes.

Theoretically, any prefix could be called a preverbal element. However, in practice, the term preverb applies more narrowly in those families and refers to a prefixed element that is normally outside the premise of verbal morphology like locations of noun elements or, less often, noun elements themselves.

Northwest Caucasian languages
In Northwest Caucasian languages, they can have nouns, directional and locative preverbs (like prepositions), like in this example from Ubykh:

Caddoan
In Caddoan linguistics, preverbal elements are less well defined as a class, and often, "preverb" designates a part of the verbal root that can be separated from the rest of the root by certain prefixes, as in this Wichita example:

Mandarin Chinese
For Mandarin Chinese and many other varieties of Chinese, the term refers to some words that carry the meanings of prepositions in English. In Chinese, they are lexically verbs and appear before the noun in question. They are more commonly referred to as coverbs.

Georgian
In Georgian, a Kartvelian language, the main function of a preverb is to distinguish the present tenses and the future tenses. To turn a present tense verb into a future tense, a preverb is added to the verb compound. In addition, preverbs also have directional meanings in Georgian.

Preverbs are directly attached to the beginning of the verb compound:

აკეთებს ak'etebs ("he does it") and გააკეთებს gaak'etebs ("he will do it")
ვწერ vts'er ("I am writing") and დავწერ davts'er ("I will write")

Note in those two examples that the meaning of the future tense is achieved only by adding the preverb; no other grammatical change occurs. In these examples, preverbs have directional meanings:

მოდის modis ("he/she is coming")
მიდის midis ("he/she is going")
ადის adis ("he/she is going up (the stairs)", "he/she is getting on (a bus)")
ჩამოდის chamodis ("he/she is arriving")
შემოდის shemodis ("he/she is entering")

Again, note that only the preverbs are changed to convey the meaning of various directional meanings. Preverbs add directional meanings not only to the verbs of motion but also to any other kind of verbs. Compare the examples of the verb -tser- ("write"):

დავწერე davts'ere ("I wrote it")
მოგწერე mogts'ere ("I wrote it to you")
მივწერე mivts'ere ("I wrote it to him/them")
გადაგიწერე gadagits'ere ("I wrote to you (from a place)")

As can be seen from the examples, the preverb changes according to the indirect object (the person for (to) whom the verb is being done).

Many verbs have a common root. For example, "end" and "stay" have the same verb root, -rch-. The meanings of the verbs are distinguished by their preverbs and other elements of the verb compound:

რჩება rcheba ("he is staying"), დარჩება darcheba ("he will stay")
რჩება rcheba ("it is ending"), მორჩება morcheba ("it will end")

As is clear, the verbs are identical in the present tense but differ in the future tense by their preverbs.

Modern Persian
A preverb is a morpheme, which is applied together with the participles modifying their meaning and the meaning of their derivates.

Persian preverbs, referred to as "āndar" or "dar", are:

bar
bāz
farā and hā
farāz
foru and hō
ham
negah and negāh
pas
piš
ru
sar
var
vā

Pre-verbs can modify the procedure attribute of the verbs and the infinitives, but they do not change their objective attribute:

 

The Pre-verb is normally positioned ahead of the verb. If the verb is composed of two separable components, the pre-verb is positioned ahead of the second component. The Pre-verb can be positioned at the end of the sentence, owing to versification requirements:

از کارِ خير عزمِ تو هرگز نگشت باز

هرگز زِ راه بازنگشته‌ست هيچ تير

Manuchehri (11th - 12th Century AD)

Algonquian
In Algonquian languages, preverbs can be described as phonologically separate words that may precede a verb and share its inflection. In particular, pronominal prefixes or initial change are applied to the first preverb, if any, of the verb complex rather than to the verb stem. Their meaning can range from past tense or perfective aspect to meanings for which English might use an adverb or another verb, like these from Ojibwe:

In Munsee, some words can come between a preverb and its verb.

See also prenoun in such languages.

Pingelapese 
Pingelapese is a language spoken on the Island of Pingelap atoll, located in Micronesia. This language uses preverbs in existential sentences, one of their four sentence structures. The verb is used when a character of a story or statement is already known.

References 

PVB:preverb

Grammar
Parts of speech